"Yesterday" is a song by the Black Eyed Peas, released as a promotional single on July 17, 2015. The song was written by the Peas and produced by front man Will.i.am. The song does not include Fergie, which caused some media speculation as to her membership in the group, but she remained an official member.

Music video
The video, directed by Pasha Shapiro caused controversy when artist Erykah Badu called the group out on Twitter for copying ideas for the music video from her song "Honey".

References

External links
 

2015 songs
2015 singles
Black Eyed Peas songs
Interscope Records singles
Song recordings produced by will.i.am
Songs written by will.i.am
Songs written by apl.de.ap
Songs written by Taboo (rapper)